WTYS may refer to:

 WTYS (AM), a radio station (1340 AM) licensed to Marianna, Florida, United States
 WTYS-FM, a radio station (94.1 FM) licensed to Marianna, Florida, United States